Ichthyodes is a genus of beetles in the family Cerambycidae, containing the following species:

 Ichthyodes affinis Breuning, 1939
 Ichthyodes albovittata Breuning, 1940
 Ichthyodes biguttula Newman, 1842
 Ichthyodes bisignifera (Pascoe, 1867)
 Ichthyodes fergussoni Breuning, 1970
 Ichthyodes floccifera Breuning, 1939
 Ichthyodes floccosa (Pascoe, 1867)
 Ichthyodes jackmani Hüdepohl, 1989
 Ichthyodes kaszabiana Breuning, 1975
 Ichthyodes leucostictica Breuning, 1942
 Ichthyodes longicornis Breuning, 1939
 Ichthyodes neopommeriana Breuning, 1940
 Ichthyodes ochreoguttata Breuning, 1942
 Ichthyodes pseudosybroides Breuning, 1942
 Ichthyodes spinipennis Breuning, 1939
 Ichthyodes sybroides (Pascoe, 1867)
 Ichthyodes szekessyi (Breuning, 1953)
 Ichthyodes trobriandensis Breuning, 1947
 Ichthyodes truncata (Aurivillius, 1917)

References

 
Cerambycidae genera